Flavoparmelia is a genus of foliose lichens in the family Parmeliaceae. Because of their appearance, they are commonly known as greenshield lichens. The widely distributed genus contains 32 species. It was circumscribed by American lichenologist Mason Hale in 1986 to contain 17 former Pseudoparmelia species with broad lobes, usnic acid in the cortex, and isolichenan in the cell walls.

Description
Older parts of the upper thallus surface are wrinkled, while the newer parts are smooth. There is a black lower surface with simple, unbranched rhizines, and a distinct bare zone around the margin. The photobiont partner is green algae from genus Trebouxia. Flavoparmelia has larger spores than other segregate genera of Pseudoparmelia.

Species

Flavoparmelia baltimorensis (Gyeln. & Fóriss) Hale (1986)
Flavoparmelia caperata (L.) Hale (1986)
Flavoparmelia caperatula (Nyl.) Elix, O.Blanco & A.Crespo (2010)
Flavoparmelia citrinescens (Gyeln.) O.Blanco, A.Crespo & Elix (2010)
Flavoparmelia diffractaica Elix & J.Johnst. (1988)
Flavoparmelia ecuadorensis T.H.Nash, Elix & J.Johnst. (1987)
Flavoparmelia euplecta (Stirt.) Hale (1986)
Flavoparmelia ferax (Müll.Arg.) Hale (1986)
Flavoparmelia haysomii (C.W.Dodge) Hale (1986)
Flavoparmelia haywardiana Elix & J.Johnst. (1988)
Flavoparmelia helmsii (Kurok. & Filson) Hale (1986)
Flavoparmelia kantvilasii Elix (1993) – New South Wales
Flavoparmelia marchantii Elix, O.Blanco & A.Crespo (2005) – Australia
Flavoparmelia norfolkensis Elix & Streimann (1989) – Norfolk Island
Flavoparmelia plicata Aptroot & M.Cáceres (2014) – Brazil
Flavoparmelia proeuplecta Elix & J.Johnst. (1988)
Flavoparmelia rutidota (Hook.f. & Taylor) Hale (1986)
Flavoparmelia scabrosina Elix & J.Johnst. (1988)
Flavoparmelia secalonica Elix & J.Johnst. (1988)
Flavoparmelia soredians (Nyl.) Hale (1986)
Flavoparmelia springtonensis (Elix) Hale (1986)
Flavoparmelia subambigua (Hale) O.Blanco, A.Crespo & Elix (2010)
Flavoparmelia succinprotocetrarica Elix & J.Johnst. (1988)
Flavoparmelia virensica Elix, O.Blanco & A.Crespo (2010)

References

Parmeliaceae
Lichen genera
Taxa named by Mason Hale
Lecanorales genera
Taxa described in 1986